The Kansas Soccer Association is the governing body of soccer in the state of Kansas.

References

External links
 Kansas Soccer Association official site

State Soccer Associations
Soccer in Kansas
1950 establishments in Kansas
Organizations based in Kansas
Sports organizations established in 1950
Organizations based in Olathe, Kansas